This is a list of electoral districts (informally called ridings) in Canada for the Canadian federal election of 1949.  In 1947, ten new districts were created, but Newfoundland became a province in 1949 adding seven new districts. There were no elections held between 1947 and 1949, and there were no by-elections held in Newfoundland after joining confederation.

Electoral districts are constituencies that each elect one Member of Parliament in Canada's House of Commons every election.

Newfoundland – 7 seats
Bonavista—Twillingate
Burin—Burgeo
Grand Falls—White Bay
Humber—St. George's
St. John's East
St. John's West
Trinity—Conception

Nova Scotia – 13 seats
Annapolis—Kings
Antigonish—Guysborough
Cape Breton North and Victoria
Cape Breton South
Colchester—Hants
Cumberland
Digby—Yarmouth
Halifax*
Inverness—Richmond
Lunenburg
Pictou
Queens—Shelburne

Prince Edward Island – 4 seats
King's
Prince
Queen's*

New Brunswick – 10 seats
Charlotte
Gloucester
Kent
Northumberland
Restigouche—Madawaska
Royal
St. John—Albert
Victoria—Carleton
Westmorland
York—Sunbury

Quebec – 73 seats
Argenteuil—Deux-Montagnes
Beauce
Beauharnois
Bellechasse
Berthier—Maskinongé
Bonaventure
Brome—Missisquoi
Cartier
Chambly—Rouville
Champlain
Chapleau
Charlevoix
Châteauguay—Huntingdon—Laprairie
Chicoutimi
Compton—Frontenac
Dorchester
Drummond—Arthabaska
Gaspé
Gatineau
Hochelaga
Hull
Îles-de-la-Madeleine 
Jacques Cartier
Joliette—L'Assomption—Montcalm
Kamouraska
Labelle
Lac-Saint-Jean
Lafontaine
Lapointe
Laurier
Laval
Lévis
Lotbinière
Maisonneuve—Rosemont
Matapédia—Matane
Mégantic
Mercier
Montmagny—L'Islet
Mount Royal
Nicolet—Yamaska
Notre-Dame-de-Grâce
Outremont—St-Jean
Papineau
Pontiac—Témiscamingue
Portneuf
Quebec East
Quebec South
Quebec West
Québec—Montmorency
Richelieu—Verchères
Richmond—Wolfe
Rimouski
Roberval
Saguenay
Saint-Hyacinthe—Bagot
Saint-Jean—Iberville—Napierville
Saint-Maurice—Laflèche
Shefford
Sherbrooke
St-Denis
St. Henri
St. Ann
St. Antoine—Westmount
St. James
St. Lawrence—St. George
St. Mary
Stanstead
Témiscouata
Terrebonne
Trois-Rivières
Vaudreuil—Soulanges
Verdun—La Salle
Villeneuve

Ontario – 83 seats
Algoma East
Algoma West
Brant—Wentworth
Brantford
Broadview
Bruce
Carleton
Cochrane
Danforth
Davenport
Dufferin—Simcoe
Durham
Eglinton
Elgin
Essex East
Essex South
Essex West
Fort William
Frontenac—Addington
Glengarry
Greenwood
Grenville—Dundas
Grey North
Grey—Bruce
Haldimand
Halton
Hamilton East
Hamilton West
Hastings South
Hastings—Peterborough
High Park
Huron North
Huron—Perth
Kenora—Rainy River
Kent
Kingston City
Lambton West
Lambton—Kent
Lanark
Leeds
Lincoln
London
Middlesex East
Middlesex West
Nipissing
Norfolk
Northumberland
Ontario
Ottawa East
Ottawa West
Oxford
Parkdale
Parry Sound—Muskoka
Peel
Perth
Peterborough West
Port Arthur
Prescott
Prince Edward—Lennox
Renfrew North
Renfrew South
Rosedale
Russell
Simcoe East
Simcoe North
Spadina
St. Paul's
Stormont
Sudbury
Timiskaming
Timmins
Trinity
Victoria
Waterloo North
Waterloo South
Welland
Wellington North
Wellington South
Wentworth
York East
York North
York South
York West

Manitoba – 16 seats
Brandon
Churchill
Dauphin
Lisgar
Marquette
Norquay
Portage—Neepawa
Provencher
Selkirk
Souris
Springfield
St. Boniface
Winnipeg North
Winnipeg North Centre
Winnipeg South
Winnipeg South Centre

Saskatchewan – 20 seats
Assiniboia
Humboldt
Kindersley
Lake Centre
Mackenzie
Maple Creek
Meadow Lake
Melfort
Melville
Moose Jaw
Moose Mountain
Prince Albert
Qu'Appelle
Regina City
Rosetown—Biggar
Rosthern
Saskatoon
Swift Current
The Battlefords
Yorkton

Alberta – 17 seats
Acadia
Athabaska
Battle River
Bow River
Calgary East
Calgary West
Camrose
Edmonton East
Edmonton West
Jasper—Edson
Lethbridge
Macleod
Medicine Hat
Peace River
Red Deer
Vegreville
Wetaskiwin

British Columbia – 18 seats
Burnaby—Richmond
Cariboo
Coast-Capilano
Comox—Alberni
Fraser Valley
Kamloops
Kootenay East
Kootenay West
Nanaimo
New Westminster
Skeena
Vancouver Centre
Vancouver East
Vancouver Quadra
Vancouver South
Vancouver—Burrard
Victoria
Yale

Yukon/Northwest Territories  – 1 seat
Yukon—Mackenzie River
*returned two members

1947-1952